Xu Jianbin  is a professor in the department of electronic engineering and director of material research center at The Chinese University of Hong Kong (CUHK). He is also a Distinguished Research Fellow at the Shenzhen Institutes of Advanced Technology, one of the Chinese Academy of Sciences.

Education 

Xu graduated from Nanjing University in 1983 and attained a research master's degree under the supervision of Zhang Shuyi (Academicians of the Chinese Academy of Sciences) from Nanjing University in 1986. From 1988 to 1993, he studied at the University of Konstanz in Germany for Doctor of Natural Science (Dr. rer. nat.). His supervisor, Klaus Dransfeld, is a member of the German National Academy of Sciences. During his PhD study, he focused on nanoscience and nanotechnology, especially scanning probe microscopy and near-field microscopy as well as their applications in energy transport and processes associated with electrons. Since graduation, he has been affiliated with the Department of Electronic Engineering of The Chinese University of Hong Kong.

Honors and awards 
Joint Research Fund for Overseas and Hong Kong-Macao Scholars (formerly Outstanding Youth Fund for Overseas Chinese), National Science Foundation of China (NSFC) 海外及港澳学者合作研究基金 (原海外杰出青年基金)

Chang Jiang Scholar and Chair Professor, Ministry of Education (MOE) 教育部长江学者讲座教授

Vice-Chancellor's Outstanding Fellow of Engineering, CUHK香港中文大学工程学院杰出学者校长奖

Research Excellence Awards, CUHK香港中文大学卓越研究奖 

Fellow of Institute of Electrical and Electronics Engineers

Fellow of Hong Kong Institution of Engineers Fellow

Professional and Editorial Activities 

Vice Chairman of the Hong Kong Science Society (2007-2012); Editorial Board of Journal of Electron Microscopy (2010-2013); Secretary-General of the Hong Kong Materials Society; Associate Editor of Science Bulletin;
Member of Editorial Board of Journal of Microelectronics; 
Member of Editorial Board of 2D Materials and Applications;
Council Member of the China Vacuum Society; Referee of more than 30 scientific and technical journals, including Nature offspring journals, JACS, Advanced Materials, IEEE Journal, ACS Nano, etc.

Research interests and attainments 

Scanning probe microscopy, and advanced electronic materials, especially in the transport properties and device physics of carbon-based optoelectronic thin film materials, the preparation and characterization of oxide-based low-dimensional nanostructures, the interface properties of silicon-compound-based ultrathin gate insulating layers, novel scanning probe techniques, plasmonic nanophotonics, nano-characteristics of ferroelectric materials, nanoscale thermal conduction, and atomic force microscopy of crystallographic morphology.

Major attainments include the insightful understanding of the interaction of graphene with silicon dioxide substrate, especially carrier transport properties and scattering mechanisms; achieving the highest carrier mobility of graphene on silicon dioxide at room temperature; growth of graphene and other 2D layered materials both experimentally and theoretically; and the development of high-quality graphene growth; the advances in high-performance graphene-based broadband photodetectors; the transport properties of organic semiconductor thin films and monocrystalline crystals, the interface properties of oxide-based semiconductor thin films; the development of high-k dielectric layers for the fabrication of low-cost and low-voltage organic transistors.

Projects and conferences

Xu has held more than 30 research projects (GRF, CRF, Hong Kong Research Grants Council, National Natural Science Foundation, etc.) as PI. He secured Joint Research Fund for Overseas and Hong Kong and Macao Scholars in 2009 and 2011 (formerly Outstanding Youth Fund for Overseas Chinese) under NSFC, along with Joint Research Fund Scheme under the auspices of NSFC and Hong Kong Research Grants Council (RGC) in 2007 and 2012, Collaborative Research Fund (CRF) under the auspices of RGC in 2008, etc. At the same time, as one of the main participants, Xu has planned and implemented the project entitled "Smart Solar Energy Harvesting, Storage and Utilization" funded by RGC Theme Research Fund (TRS) in 2013 (the base amount being more than 60 million HK$), and the "Innovative Research Team of Advanced Electronic Packaging Materials" under the auspices of Guangdong Province (tenable to Shenzhen Institutes of Advanced Technology, Chinese Academy of Sciences, with a base amount of more than 50 million RMB) in 2012. In the past five years or so, he has been largely engaged in carbon-based optoelectronic thin film materials and devices, organic optoelectronic materials and devices, oxide-based materials and devices, plasmonic nanophotonics, low-dimensional semiconductor materials and devices, high thermal conductivity materials, perovskite optoelectronic materials and devices. So far he has more than 350 papers published in SCI journals, and received more than 7,000 citations by peers. Besides, he has delivered more than 200 presentations at international conferences and colloquia. Xu has actively participated in and organized various academic activities. He has also assisted in organizing various international conferences and technical seminars, including the 6th International Conference in Asia (ICA) under the auspices of the International Union of Materials Research Societies Union (IUMRS) in 2000, the 8th International Conference of Electronic Materials (ICEM) under the auspices of the International Union of Materials Research Societies in 2002, and the IEEE Conference on Electronic Devices in Hong Kong in 2003, International Conference on Solid State Electronic Circuits in 2005 and 2008, International Symposium on Frontiers of Nanophotonics in 2005, China International Conference on Nanoscience and Technology in 2009, Materials Research Society Spring Meeting in 2011, Croucher Advanced Study Institute on Printed Electronics in 2013, International Graphene Innovation Conference in 2014, IEDM/IEEE International Electron Devices Meeting in 2014 and 2015, Gordon Research Conference in 2018, etc.

References 

Year of birth missing (living people)
Living people
20th-century Chinese engineers
21st-century Chinese engineers
Academic staff of the Chinese University of Hong Kong
Fellow Members of the IEEE
Hong Kong engineers
Nanjing University alumni
University of Konstanz alumni